Eva Hudečková (born 3 December 1949 in Prague) is Czech actress, playwright and writer.

She studied dramatic art at the Drama Faculty of the Academy of Performing Arts in Prague. She played many characters in the theatre and films and has won several awards. Since 1986 she has devoted herself to literature, she has written several film subjects, scripts and stories. Her film O ztracené lásce was screened by Czech television. Czech radio produced dramatisation of her book entitled Bratříček Golem (Little Brother Golem). Her husband is violinist Václav Hudeček.

External links 
 Prix Bohemia Radio – jury
 Biography

1949 births
Living people
Czech stage actresses
20th-century Czech dramatists and playwrights
Czech film actresses
Czech women dramatists and playwrights
21st-century Czech dramatists and playwrights
21st-century Czech women writers
20th-century Czech women writers
Actresses from Prague